Salma Mohanad Yousef Ghazal (born 19 October 1998) is an American-born Jordanian footballer who plays as a goalkeeper for the Houston Cougars and the Jordan women's national team.

Early life
Ghazal was raised in Sugar Land, Texas.

References 

1998 births
Living people
Jordanian women's footballers
Jordan women's international footballers
Women's association football goalkeepers
American women's soccer players
Soccer players from Texas
Sportspeople from the Houston metropolitan area
People from Sugar Land, Texas
American people of Jordanian descent
Texas Southern Tigers women's soccer players
Houston Cougars women's soccer players
Women's Premier Soccer League players